No. 267 Squadron RAF was a unit of the Royal Air Force that served during World War I & World War II. The squadron has been formed a total of four times.

History
The squadron was formed at RAF Kalafrana, Malta on 27 September 1918 from Nos. 360, 361, 362 and 363 Flights as an anti-submarine unit flying patrols in the Mediterranean Sea until the end of hostilities and remained at Malta until being renumbered No. 481 Flight on 1 August 1923.

On 19 August 1940, the squadron was reformed from Communication Unit, Heliopolis RAF as a transport squadron for operational duties in Egypt. In August 1942, operations extended to transport throughout the Mediterranean area and also undertook supply-dropping missions to resistance fighters in Italy and the Balkans, including Operation Wildhorn, the operation to bring back parts of a recovered V-2 rocket from Poland. The squadron moved to Italy in November 1943 and later to India in February 1945 during the Fourteenth Army's final offensive during the Burma campaign. The squadron disbanded on 30 June 1946, although continued operations until 21 July.

Reformed on 15 February 1954 at RAF Kuala Lumpur, Malaya as a transport support and communications squadron. It was renumbered No. 209 Squadron on 1 November 1958. The squadron was again reformed as a transport squadron on 1 November 1962 at RAF Benson with No. 38 Group until being disbanded on 30 June 1970.

Aircraft operated

References

Citations

Bibliography
Jefford, C G. RAF Squadron, first edition 1988, Airlife Publishing, UK, .

External links

 RAF website
 Squadron History
 Ron Morgan & RAF 267 Squadron - Ron's life as part of the ground crew in 267 Squadron during WWII

No. 267
267
Military units and formations established in 1918
Transport units and formations of the Royal Air Force